International Convention Center Jeju (ICC Jeju) opened in 2003 on Jeju Island, South Korea, in the Jungmun Resort near the city of Seogwipo. It began under private-public consortium ownership and is becoming fully publicly owned. It consists of a larger oval-shaped glass structure and a smaller round glass annex, and surrounding facilities. The largest hall accommodates 4,300 people, with various smaller halls and meeting rooms.

The building consists of a large elliptical fully glass-wall structure four floors above ground (and two below) connected to a smaller circular glass building housing restaurant and coffee shop, and is set on a cliff over the Pacific Ocean.  The building houses the Jeju Convention Bureau.

In 2007 construction began on the adjoining 50,000 sq. meter lot to build a 600-room hotel-condominium to serve as ICC Jeju's "anchor hotel," scheduled to be completed in 2009.

External links 
 

Tourist attractions in Jeju Province
Buildings and structures in Jeju Province
Convention centers in South Korea